Entertainment is the third studio album by electroclash duo and performance troupe Fischerspooner, released on May 5, 2009 in the United States, and on May 4 around the world. On April 19, 2009 a teaser for this album appeared on YouTube.

Written over a two-year period with producer Jeff Saltzman (The Killers, The Sounds) and recorded independently in a carriage house in Brooklyn with an intimate circle of artists working on the band's live show as Ian Pai, Ben Bromley and Sam Kearney. Other special guests include actress/performance artist Ann Magnuson, UK musician Gabriel Olegavich and electronic collagist Steven Stein.

The first single, "Supply & Demand" was made available as a free mp3 download from the band's website. The album's iTunes bonus track, "Fascinating" is a cover of an unreleased R.E.M. song originally composed for their 2001 album Reveal. Background vocals on "Supply & Demand" were sung by Heather Porcaro.

Entertainment received generally mixed reviews. The album holds a score of 60 out of 100 on the review aggregator website Metacritic.

Track listing

Charts

References

2009 albums
Fischerspooner albums